St Giles Trust is a charity that works with people facing disadvantages such as homelessness, long-term unemployment, an offending background, addiction, severe poverty and involvement in gangs.

History
The organisation was established in 1962 by Fr. John Nicholls as The Camberwell Samaritans in the crypt of St Giles church in Camberwell, south London, offering relief and support to the large number of destitute people in the parish. This included emergency relief and support for the large number of homeless men in the area - a prevailing feature of the area at that time due to many local hostels and workhouses, including the infamous Camberwell Spike on Gordon Road. The Trust formally dissolved its ties to the church in the 1970s.

In 1995 it moved to its current headquarters in Georgian House, Camberwell Church Street and became known as the Southwark Day Centre. In 1998, St Giles started to offer housing casework in HMP Wandsworth. Over the next decade, the prisons work grew along with a range of other services both in prison and in the community.

Today, it has expanded beyond criminal justice to also address unemployment, homelessness, troubled families and vulnerable young exploited by county lines.

In 2019/20, the charity helped 20,671 people through its services. In July 2021 the charity launched a campaign to raise awareness of Child Criminal Exploitation in the UK.

St Giles' vision and Peer Advice model
St Giles state that their vision is to "transform the way services for the most socially excluded are delivered by highlighting the impact of well trained, motivated staff who have lived experience of social exclusion themselves."

Underpinning all the charity's services is its Peer Advisor Programme. It offers a structured package of support and training enabling people who have overcome disadvantaged to enable them to move their own lives forward and help others in the process.  Known as Peer Advisors they work towards a Level 3 Advice and Guidance qualification through a structured package of training, voluntary placements, supervision and assessment, with the aim of developing employability and professionalism.

The National Lottery Community Fund (TNLCF) have been a long-term funder of this work.  In April 2019, St Giles was awarded £3.6 million from the TNLCF to establish a network of Peer Hubs across the UK to enable people from disadvantaged backgrounds the opportunity to train as Peer Advisors and support other local organisations.

Services provided
St Giles Trust provides specialist services in the following areas:

 Work with children and young people involved in or at risk of criminal exploitation
 Services helping adults and young people facing unemployment and poverty
 Help for vulnerable women and families
 Prison and community-based support for people in the criminal justice system
 Specialist support for adults facing complex barriers

Locations
St Giles Trust's head office is based in Camberwell, South London. Their work is based in prisons and communities across England and Wales. Additional offices are in North London, Leeds, Ipswich and Cardiff.

Campaigns

Keep Children Safe This Summer

In July 2021 St Giles launched a campaign to raise awareness of child criminal exploitation. Exploitation of children is often used to facilitate county lines drug running, whereby vulnerable children and adults are groomed and coerced into trafficking and dealing drugs on behalf of criminal gangs. Alongside drugs, other illegal economies such as human and sex trafficking are also implicated in county lines.

Awards
St Giles Trust has won The Charity Awards 2009 and 2007, The Third Sector Excellence Awards 2007, The Butler Trust Awards 2009, The Justice Awards 2009, The Centre for Social Justice Awards 2009 and the Andy Ludlow Awards 2007.

It has also been included in the Sunday Times Best 100 Companies to Work For since 2009.

Its SOS Project working with young people involved in gangs won the Advice, Support and Advocacy category of the Charity Awards of 2014.  In November 2014, Mona Morrison of St Giles received the Highly Commended Longford Prize, in recognition of successful projects with youth gangs. Its peer-led work with foreign national prisoners won second prize of the Robin Corbett Awards for Prisoner Rehabilitation in 2016.  The 2017 Longford Prize for Outstanding Achievement went to David Jolie of St Giles, while CJ Burge from the SOS team was runner up Criminal Justice Champion at the Howard League's awards.  In 2019, Lee Dutton from St Giles' south Wales office was commended in the Butler Trust awards for his work with families with complex needs.
In 2022, London Skills and Employment Manager Brendan Ross was awarded the Longford Prize.

Honours
Rob Owen, the chief executive, was awarded an OBE in the New Years Honours List in 2015 in recognition of his work within the criminal justice sector.

Elroy Palmer, a team leader on the charity's SOS Project was awarded an MBE in the Queen's Birthday Honours List in 2016 in recognition of his work with young people involved in gangs.

Junior Smart, who founded the SOS Project in 2006, was awarded an OBE in the 2019 New Years Honours List.  This followed an Honorary Doctorate from University of Greenwich in 2018.

Patrons
St Giles' current patrons are:

 Lord Phillips of Matravers KG 
 Jenny Agutter OBE
 Lord Gus O'Donnell GCB FBA
 Christine Ohuruogu MBE
 Sam Bailey
 Mark Tennant
 Martin P Griffiths
 Martine Rose
 Freddie Fox
 Baron Hogan-Howe QPM Kt

Royal patronage
The charity has had a long association with royalty. In 1963, the original day centre, one of the first of it kind, was opened by Queen Elizabeth The Queen Mother. In 1995, her grandson, Prince Charles, opened the new day centre at Georgian House. To mark the charity's 50th anniversary year in 2012, Prince William was named patron of the year.

References

External links
 St Giles Trust Website

Prison charities based in the United Kingdom